Apollonius of Tyre is the subject of an ancient short novella, popular in the Middle Ages.  Existing in numerous forms in many languages, the text is thought to be translated from an ancient Greek manuscript, now lost.

Plot summary

In most versions, the eponymous hero is hunted and persecuted after he reveals Antiochus of Antioch's incestuous relationship with his daughter. After many travels and adventures, in which Apollonius loses both his wife and his daughter and thinks them both dead, he is eventually reunited with his family through unlikely circumstances or intercession by gods. In some English versions Apollonius is shipwrecked and becomes a tutor to a princess who falls in love with him, and the good king gradually discovers his daughter's wishes. The major themes are the punishment of inappropriate lust—the incestuous king invariably comes to a bad end—and the ultimate rewards of love and fidelity.

Origins (Latin and Greek?)

The story is first mentioned in Latin by Venantius Fortunatus in his Carmina (Bk. vi. 8, 11. 5–6) during the late 6th century; it is conjectured, based on similarities with the Ephesian Tale of Xenophon of Ephesus and the presence of idioms awkward in Latin but typical in Greek, that the original was a Greek romance of the third century. Some fragments of Greek romance, however, point to the possibility of an even older date. The earliest manuscripts of the tale, in a Latin version, date from the 9th or 10th century but are from late antiquity. Thus they show an intersection of Greek and Roman as well as pre-Christian and Christian influences. Overall, the work is classed with other ancient Greek romance novels.

Some scholars hold that the riddles with which the king tests the hero in many versions may be a later addition: ten derive from the c. fourth-century Latin riddle-collection attributed to Symphosius. Other scholars believe the incest story to have been a later addition as well, though others, including Elizabeth Archibald, see it as an integral thematic element of the tale.

The most widespread Latin versions are those of Godfrey of Viterbo, who incorporated it into his Pantheon of 1185 as if it were actual history, Historia Apollonii regis Tyri and a version in the Gesta Romanorum.

Translations
'Fifty to a hundred versions' of the story are known from antiquity into the early modern period, mostly European, including texts in English, Dutch, German, Danish, French, Spanish, Italian, Portuguese, Polish, Russian, Hungarian, Greek, and Latin.

The earliest vernacular translation is an incomplete Old English prose text from the 11th century, sometimes called the first English novel. The existence of this unique text is unusual, as secular prose fiction from that time is extremely rare. The manuscript copy may only have survived because it was bound into a book together with Archbishop Wulfstan's homilies. Various versions of the tale were later written in most European languages.

A notable English version is in the eighth book of John Gower's Confessio Amantis (1390), which uses it as an exemplum against lust.  It is described as being based on Pantheon, but it contains many details that work does not but the old Historia does.

Its numerous vernacular versions, along with the Latin ones, attest to its popularity throughout the Middle Ages. It appears in an old Danish ballad collected in Danmarks gamle Folkeviser.

Robert Copland translated from the French the romance of Kynge Appolyne of Thyre (W. de Worde, 1510).

Later versions and influence

The story was retold in thirteenth-century Castilian as Libro de Apolonio. It is also a major inspiration of the chanson de geste Jordain de Blaivies.

Robert Copland wrote an early 16th-century prose version.

William Shakespeare and George Wilkins's play Pericles, Prince of Tyre was based in part on Gower's version, with the change of name probably inspired by Philip Sidney's Arcadia.  Apollonius of Tyre was also a source for his plays Twelfth Night and The Comedy of Errors.

Notes

External links
 , from Gesta Romanorum
 Plot summary
 Marcus Welser's 1595 Latin edition, "Narratio eorum quae contigerunt Apollonio Tyrio"
 The 1682 reprint of Marcus Welser's 1595 Latin edition, "Narratio eorum quae contigerunt Apollonio Tyrio"
 The Anglo-Saxon version in the 1834 Benjamin Thorpe English translation
 The Latin Library edition of the Latin text
 The Librivox audio edition of the Latin text
 includes Latin text&translation of Historia Apollonii regis Tyri 

Latin prose texts
Translations into Latin
Medieval legends
Early medieval literature
Romance (genre)
Fictional kings